van Dommelen is a Dutch surname. Notable people with the surname include:

Caroline van Dommelen (1874–1957), Dutch silent film actress
Ed van Dommelen (1934–2021), Dutch politician
Jan van Dommelen (1878–1942), Dutch silent era film actor
Maria Scheepers van Dommelen (1892-1989), Belgian pianist and music educator

Surnames of Dutch origin